Mission-based learning (MBL) is a student-centered approach created by the Smithsonian EdLab at the National Postal Museum. It encourages students to make meaningful connections between themselves, their communities and the global community. Students build upon prior skills and use critical thinking, research skills, creativity, independent and collaborative work to solve authentic, relevant issues facing the modern era. Students employ diverse tools of the 21st-century classroom to broadcast their solutions and positively impact the global community.

Goals of mission-based learning

 Students approach an authentic issue or concept relevant to their community.
 Students make a personal connection to the issue or concept proposed in the mission.
 Students develop a solution to the mission using multiple resources available in the 21st-century classroom (e.g. technology, social media, museums, podcasts, texts, etc.)
 Students impact their community by publicly broadcasting their solution to the mission.

Connections to Common Core & State Standards

 Major Shifts
 Close Analytical Reading - in order to complete a mission, students will need to have a good understanding of the texts/objects involved in the mission, and that will require analysis and repeated readings/viewing of the text/object.
 Providing Evidence - as part of the mission process, students must demonstrate the connections between the texts/objects used in the mission and their solution.
 Academic Vocabulary - the mission must connect to the content area and standards which will facilitate student use of content-specific discourse and encourage additional academic vocabulary development.
 Short-focus Research - in order to complete a mission, students will need to research issues, conduct interviews, and survey the best methods to broadcast their stances.
 Speaking and Listening - an effective mission requires students to observe and gauge problems in their community (listening) present their stances to the class and to the public (speaking).

MBL Guide
The mission must have students researching an issue or concept that they can relate to and make connections to with objects, texts, films, or other resources. A stance must be made on the issue and a product such as an ad campaign or a narrative

Step 1 - Crafting the mission

 Consider the overarching or essential questions of the lesson or unit you are teaching. Use those questions to develop the mission. 
 Consider these questions: What outcome do you want for your students? What is it that you want them to take away from the mission? Use the answers to the questions in writing your mission. 
 Provide as few parameters as possible in order to promote critical thinking, research, and problem-solving skills. Provide encouragement and support to those students who will hesitate or resist such open-ended assignments. 
 Incorporate a connection to their community, school, and/or culture in order to ensure student engagement and relevant application of skills. 
 Develop guiding questions that will spark discussion, debate, and thoughts about the subject of your mission.  
 Create a mission that requires students to participate in activism by finding a solution to the issue presented in the mission and broadcasting their opinions/feelings/solutions to the community affected by the issue.

Step 2 - Deploying the mission

 Start the mission with the guiding questions. Encourage discussion and debate. Record answers in plain view for students.
 Practice and model group roles in order to reduce in-fighting and uneven work distribution in groups.
 Provide limited scaffolding for students struggling with the mission. Use the following generic guiding questions, but modify them if needed to meet the needs of your students and/or mission:
 What common things do you see?
 How are you affected by the issue?
 What is your message? Now, what is your method of relaying this message?
 Stick to your time limit and stress the content over aesthetics. Encourage students to polish missions after the presentation.

Step 3 - Stepping back from the mission

Inquire students about their experience. These are some guiding questions for your class discussion:
 What tools did you use?
 What problems did you encounter?
 Did you have any surprises?
 If you had more time, what would you do differently?
Have students reflect individually:
 What elements of the mission were meaningful to you?
 What parts of the mission do you see relevant to your future job experience?
 What tools do you want to test out in the future?
 What did you contribute to your group?

References 

Learning methods